Tmarus is a genus of crab spiders, comprising 227 species:

 Tmarus aberrans Mello-Leitão, 1944 – Brazil
 Tmarus aculeatus Chickering, 1950 – Panama
 Tmarus africanus Lessert, 1919 – Tanzania, South Africa
 Tmarus albidus (L. Koch, 1876) – Queensland
 Tmarus albifrons Piza, 1944 – Brazil
 Tmarus albisterni Mello-Leitão, 1942 – Argentina
 Tmarus albolineatus Keyserling, 1880 – Brazil
 Tmarus alticola Mello-Leitão, 1929 – Brazil
 Tmarus amazonicus Mello-Leitão, 1929 – Brazil
 Tmarus ampullatus Soares, 1943 – Brazil
 Tmarus angulatus (Walckenaer, 1837) – USA, Canada
 Tmarus angulifer Simon, 1895 – Queensland
 Tmarus aporus Soares & Camargo, 1948 – Brazil
 Tmarus atypicus Mello-Leitão, 1929 – Brazil
 Tmarus australis Mello-Leitão, 1941 – Argentina
 Tmarus baptistai Silva-Moreira, 2010 – Brazil
 Tmarus bedoti Lessert, 1928 – Congo
 Tmarus berlandi Lessert, 1928 – Congo
 Tmarus bifasciatus Mello-Leitão, 1929 – Peru, Brazil
 Tmarus bifidipalpus Mello-Leitão, 1943 – Brazil
 Tmarus biocellatus Mello-Leitão, 1929 – Brazil
 Tmarus bisectus Piza, 1944 – Brazil
 Tmarus borgmeyeri Mello-Leitão, 1929 – Brazil
 Tmarus bucculentus Chickering, 1950 – Panama
 Tmarus byssinus Tang & Li, 2009 – China
 Tmarus caeruleus Keyserling, 1880 – Brazil
 Tmarus cameliformis Millot, 1942 – Africa
 Tmarus camellinus Mello-Leitão, 1929 – Brazil
 Tmarus cancellatus Thorell, 1899 – Cameroon, Bioko
 Tmarus cancellatus congoensis Comellini, 1955 – Congo
 Tmarus candefactus Caporiacco, 1954 – French Guiana
 Tmarus candidissimus Mello-Leitão, 1947 – Brazil
 Tmarus caporiaccoi Comellini, 1955 – Congo
 Tmarus caretta Mello-Leitão, 1929 – Brazil
 Tmarus caxambuensis Mello-Leitão, 1929 – Brazil
 Tmarus cinerascens (L. Koch, 1876) – Queensland
 Tmarus cinereus Mello-Leitão, 1929 – Brazil, Guyana
 Tmarus circinalis Song & Chai, 1990 – China
 Tmarus clavimanus Mello-Leitão, 1929 – Brazil
 Tmarus clavipes Keyserling, 1891 – Brazil
 Tmarus cognatus Chickering, 1950 – Panama
 Tmarus comellinii Garcia-Neto, 1989 – Congo to South Africa
 Tmarus contortus Chickering, 1950 – Panama
 Tmarus corruptus O. P.-Cambridge, 1892 – Mexico, Panama
 Tmarus craneae Chickering, 1965 – Trinidad
 Tmarus cretatus Chickering, 1965 – Panama
 Tmarus curvus Chickering, 1950 – Panama
 Tmarus decens O. P.-Cambridge, 1892 – Panama
 Tmarus decoloratus Keyserling, 1883 – Peru
 Tmarus decorus Chickering, 1965 – Panama
 Tmarus dejectus (O. P.-Cambridge, 1885) – India
 Tmarus digitatus Mello-Leitão, 1929 – Brazil
 Tmarus digitiformis Yang, Zhu & Song, 2005 – China
 Tmarus dostinikus Barrion & Litsinger, 1995 – Philippines
 Tmarus ehecatltocatl Jiménez, 1992 – Mexico
 Tmarus elongatus Mello-Leitão, 1929 – Brazil
 Tmarus eques Thorell, 1890 – Java
 Tmarus espiritosantensis Soares & Soares, 1946 – Brazil
 Tmarus estyliferus Mello-Leitão, 1929 – Brazil
 Tmarus fallax Mello-Leitão, 1929 – Brazil, Guyana
 Tmarus fanjing Yang & Yu, 2022 – China
 Tmarus farri Chickering, 1965 – Jamaica
 Tmarus fasciolatus Simon, 1906 – India
 Tmarus femellus Caporiacco, 1941 – Ethiopia
 Tmarus floridensis Keyserling, 1884 – USA
 Tmarus foliatus Lessert, 1928 – Africa, Comoro Islands
 Tmarus formosus Mello-Leitão, 1917 – Brazil
 Tmarus gajdosi Marusik & Logunov, 2002 – Mongolia
 Tmarus galapagosensis Baert, 2013 – Ecuador (Galapagos Is.)
 Tmarus geayi Caporiacco, 1954 – French Guiana
 Tmarus gongi Yin et al., 2004 – China
 Tmarus grandis Mello-Leitão, 1929 – Brazil
 Tmarus guineensis Millot, 1942 – Guinea to South Africa
 Tmarus hastatus Tang & Li, 2009 – China
 Tmarus hazevensis Levy, 1973 – Israel
 Tmarus hirsutus Mello-Leitão, 1929 – Brazil
 Tmarus histrix Caporiacco, 1954 – French Guiana
 Tmarus hiyarensis Ileperuma Arachchi & Benjamin, 2019 – Sri Lanka
 Tmarus holmbergi Schiapelli & Gerschman, 1941 – Argentina
 Tmarus homanni Chrysanthus, 1964 – New Guinea
 Tmarus humphreyi Chickering, 1965 – Panama
 Tmarus hystrix Caporiacco, 1954 – French Guiana
 Tmarus impedus Chickering, 1965 – Panama
 Tmarus incertus Keyserling, 1880 – Colombia
 Tmarus incognitus Mello-Leitão, 1929 – Brazil
 Tmarus ineptus O. P.-Cambridge, 1892 – Panama
 Tmarus infrasigillatus Mello-Leitão, 1947 – Brazil
 Tmarus innotus Chickering, 1965 – Panama
 Tmarus innumus Chickering, 1965 – Panama
 Tmarus insuetus Chickering, 1965 – Trinidad
 Tmarus intentus O. P.-Cambridge, 1892 – Guatemala, Panama
 Tmarus interritus Keyserling, 1880 – Panama, Brazil
 Tmarus jabalpurensis Gajbe & Gajbe, 1999 – India
 Tmarus jelskii (Taczanowski, 1872) – French Guiana
 Tmarus jocosus O. P.-Cambridge, 1898 – Costa Rica
 Tmarus karolae Jézéquel, 1964 – Ivory Coast
 Tmarus komi Ono, 1996 – Ryukyu Islands
 Tmarus koreanus Paik, 1973 – China, Korea
 Tmarus kotigeharus Tikader, 1963 – India
 Tmarus lanyu Zhang, Zhu & Tso, 2006 – Taiwan
 Tmarus lapadui Jézéquel, 1964 – Ivory Coast
 Tmarus latifrons Thorell, 1895 – Myanmar, Krakatau
 Tmarus lawrencei Comellini, 1955 – Congo
 Tmarus levii Chickering, 1965 – Panama
 Tmarus lichenoides Mello-Leitão, 1929 – Brazil
 Tmarus littoralis Keyserling, 1880 – Brazil
 Tmarus locketi Millot, 1942 – West, Central Africa
 Tmarus locketi djuguensis Comellini, 1955 – Congo
 Tmarus longicaudatus Millot, 1942 – West Africa, Saudi Arabia
 Tmarus longipes Caporiacco, 1947 – East Africa
 Tmarus longqicus Song & Zhu, 1993 – China
 Tmarus longus Chickering, 1965 – Panama
 Tmarus loriae Thorell, 1890 – Malaysia
 Tmarus macilentus (L. Koch, 1876) – Queensland
 Tmarus maculosus Keyserling, 1880 – Colombia
 Tmarus makiharai Ono, 1988 – Japan
 Tmarus malleti Lessert, 1919 – Central, East Africa
 Tmarus manojkaushalyai (Ileperuma Arachchi & Benjamin, 2019) – Sri Lanka
 Tmarus marmoreus (L. Koch, 1876) – Queensland
 Tmarus menglae Song & Zhao, 1994 – China
 Tmarus menotus Chickering, 1965 – Jamaica
 Tmarus metropolitanus Mello-Leitão, 1929 – Brazil
 Tmarus milloti Comellini, 1955 – Cameroon, Congo
 Tmarus minensis Mello-Leitão, 1929 – Brazil
 Tmarus minutus Banks, 1904 – USA
 Tmarus misumenoides Mello-Leitão, 1927 – Brazil
 Tmarus montericensis Keyserling, 1880 – Peru
 Tmarus morosus Chickering, 1950 – Panama
 Tmarus mourei Mello-Leitão, 1947 – Brazil
 Tmarus mundulus O. P.-Cambridge, 1892 – Panama
 Tmarus mutabilis Soares, 1944 – Brazil
 Tmarus natalensis Lessert, 1925 – South Africa
 Tmarus neocaledonicus Kritscher, 1966 – New Caledonia
 Tmarus nigrescens Mello-Leitão, 1929 – Brazil
 Tmarus nigridorsi Mello-Leitão, 1929 – Brazil
 Tmarus nigristernus Caporiacco, 1947 – Uganda
 Tmarus nigrofasciatus Mello-Leitão, 1929 – Brazil
 Tmarus nigroviridis Mello-Leitão, 1929 – Brazil
 Tmarus ningshaanensis Wang & Xi, 1998 – China
 Tmarus obesus Mello-Leitão, 1929 – Brazil, French Guiana
 Tmarus oblectator Logunov, 1992 – Russia
 Tmarus obsecus Chickering, 1965 – Panama
 Tmarus orientalis Schenkel, 1963 – China, Korea
 Tmarus pallidus Mello-Leitão, 1929 – Brazil
 Tmarus parallelus Mello-Leitão, 1943 – Brazil
 Tmarus parki Chickering, 1950 – Panama
 Tmarus paulensis Piza, 1935 – Brazil
 Tmarus pauper O. P.-Cambridge, 1892 – Panama
 Tmarus perditus Mello-Leitão, 1929 – Brazil
 Tmarus peregrinus Chickering, 1950 – Panama
 Tmarus peruvianus Berland, 1913 – Peru
 Tmarus piger (Walckenaer, 1802) – Palearctic
 Tmarus piochardi (Simon, 1866) – Mediterranean
 Tmarus pizai Soares, 1941 – Brazil
 Tmarus planetarius Simon, 1903 – Africa
 Tmarus planifrons Mello-Leitão, 1943 – Brazil
 Tmarus planquettei Jézéquel, 1966 – Ivory Coast
 Tmarus pleuronotatus Mello-Leitão, 1941 – Brazil
 Tmarus plurituberculatus Mello-Leitão, 1929 – Brazil
 Tmarus polyandrus Mello-Leitão, 1929 – Brazil
 Tmarus posticatus Simon, 1929 – Brazil
 Tmarus primitivus Mello-Leitão, 1929 – Brazil
 Tmarus probus Chickering, 1950 – Panama
 Tmarus productus Chickering, 1950 – Panama
 Tmarus prognathus Simon, 1929 – Brazil
 Tmarus projectus (L. Koch, 1876) – Queensland
 Tmarus protobius Chickering, 1965 – Panama
 Tmarus pugnax Mello-Leitão, 1929 – Brazil
 Tmarus pulchripes Thorell, 1894 – Singapore
 Tmarus punctatissimus (Simon, 1870) – Spain
 Tmarus punctatus (Nicolet, 1849) – Chile
 Tmarus qinlingensis Song & Wang, 1994 – China
 Tmarus rainbowi Mello-Leitão, 1929 – South Australia
 Tmarus rarus Soares & Soares, 1946 – Brazil
 Tmarus riccii Caporiacco, 1941 – Ethiopia
 Tmarus rimosus Paik, 1973 – Russia, China, Korea, Japan
 Tmarus rubinus Chickering, 1965 – Panama
 Tmarus rubromaculatus Keyserling, 1880 – USA
 Tmarus salai Schick, 1965 – USA
 Tmarus schoutedeni Comellini, 1955 – Congo
 Tmarus semiroseus Simon, 1909 – Vietnam
 Tmarus separatus Banks, 1898 – Panama
 Tmarus serratus Yang, Zhu & Song, 2005 – China
 Tmarus shimojanai Ono, 1997 – Ryukyu Islands
 Tmarus sigillatus Chickering, 1950 – Panama
 Tmarus simoni Comellini, 1955 – Sierra Leone
 Tmarus songi Han & Zhu, 2009 – China
 Tmarus soricinus Simon, 1906 – India
 Tmarus spicatus Tang & Li, 2009 – China
 Tmarus spinosus Comellini, 1955 – Congo
 Tmarus spinosus Zhu et al., 2005 – China
 Tmarus srisailamensis Rao et al., 2006 – India
 Tmarus staintoni (O. P.-Cambridge, 1873) – Spain, France, Algeria
 Tmarus stellio Simon, 1875 – Palearctic
 Tmarus stolzmanni Keyserling, 1880 – Peru, Galapagos Islands
 Tmarus striolatus Mello-Leitão, 1943 – Brazil
 Tmarus studiosus O. P.-Cambridge, 1892 – Panama
 Tmarus taibaiensis Song & Wang, 1994 – China
 Tmarus taishanensis Zhu & Wen, 1981 – Russia, China
 Tmarus taiwanus Ono, 1977 – China, Taiwan
 Tmarus tamazolinus Jiménez, 1988 – Mexico
 Tmarus thorelli Comellini, 1955 – Congo
 Tmarus tinctus Keyserling, 1880 – Peru
 Tmarus tonkinus Simon, 1909 – Vietnam
 Tmarus toschii Caporiacco, 1949 – Kenya
 Tmarus trifidus Mello-Leitão, 1929 – Brazil
 Tmarus trituberculatus Mello-Leitão, 1929 – Brazil
 Tmarus truncatus (L. Koch, 1876) – Queensland
 Tmarus tuberculitibiis Caporiacco, 1940 – Ethiopia
 Tmarus undatus Tang & Li, 2009 – China
 Tmarus unicus Gertsch, 1936 – USA
 Tmarus vachoni Millot, 1942 – Ivory Coast
 Tmarus variabilis (L. Koch, 1876) – Queensland
 Tmarus variatus Keyserling, 1891 – Brazil
 Tmarus verrucosus Mello-Leitão, 1948 – Guyana
 Tmarus vertumus Chickering, 1965 – Puerto Rico
 Tmarus vexillifer (Butler, 1876) – Rodriguez
 Tmarus villasboasi Mello-Leitão, 1949 – Brazil
 Tmarus viridis Keyserling, 1880 – Peru, Brazil
 Tmarus viridomaculatus Ileperuma Arachchi & Benjamin, 2019 – Sri Lanka
 Tmarus vitusus Chickering, 1965 – Panama
 Tmarus wiedenmeyeri Schenkel, 1953 – Venezuela
 Tmarus yaginumai Ono, 1977 – Japan
 Tmarus yani Yin et al., 2004 – China
 Tmarus yerohamus Levy, 1973 – Israel
 Tmarus yiminhensis Zhu & Wen, 1981 – China
 Tmarus zhui Sherwood & Li, 2021  – China

References

http://research.amnh.org/entomology/spiders/catalog/THOMISIDAE.html

Thomisidae
Araneomorphae genera
Cosmopolitan spiders